Public services in Canada are delivered by various levels of government, determined through responsibility enacted in the Constitution. Financing for those services is provided through tax receipts, sales revenues, user fees, and other government revenue sources.

Services

Health care

Primary health care in Canada is a provincial responsibility. Funding for service delivery is provided via provincial income tax receipts and federal health transfers.

Education

Primary, secondary and tertiary education in Canada is the responsibility of each provincial government. The federal government department of Indian and Northern Affairs Canada delivers education service to First Nations.

Government in Canada